Beckers Block is a group of historic commercial buildings in Huntsville, Alabama.  The two-story, five-bay structure was built in 1925.  Each bay is separated by piers that project above the roofline.  The center of each bay is raised above the parapet, creating a crenelated appearance.  Below the parapet, a rectangular panel is formed from header courses.  Cream-colored square stones decorate the entire façade.

The two southern bays were built for a J. C. Penney store, and feature display windows on either side of a recessed entryway.  A panel of glass block stretches above the entryway.  The northern three bays have single-pane windows flush with the façade with recessed doors.  A row of four-by-two paned windows, mostly in pairs and once in a triplet, stretch above the three bays.

The building was listed on the National Register of Historic Places in 1980.

References

National Register of Historic Places in Huntsville, Alabama
Commercial buildings completed in 1925